The 2020–21 Peterborough United F.C. season was the club's 87th season in their history and the eighth consecutive season in EFL League One, Along with League One, the club also participated in the FA Cup, EFL Cup, and EFL Trophy.

The season covers the period from 1 July 2020 to 30 June 2021.

With a 3–3 draw against Lincoln City on 1 May 2021, Peterborough secured automatic promotion to the Championship, making a return to the second division after an eight-year absence.

First-team squad

Statistics

|-
!colspan=15|Players out on loan:

|-
!colspan=15|Players who left the club:

|}

Disciplinary record

Transfers

Transfers in

Loans in

Loans out

Transfers out

Pre-season

Competitions

EFL League One

League table

Results summary

Results by matchday

Matches

The 2020–21 season fixtures were released on 21 August.

FA Cup

The draw for the first round was made on Monday 26, October. The second round draw was revealed on Monday, 9 November by Danny Cowley.

EFL Cup

The first round draw was made on 18 August, live on Sky Sports, by Paul Merson.

EFL Trophy

The regional group stage draw was confirmed on 18 August. The second round draw was made by Matt Murray on 20 November, at St Andrew’s. The third round was made on 10 December 2020 by Jon Parkin.

References

Peterborough United
Peterborough United F.C. seasons